The Seitz decision was a ruling by arbitrator Peter Seitz (1905–1983) on December 23, 1975, which declared that Major League Baseball (MLB) players became free agents upon playing one year for their team without a contract, effectively nullifying baseball's reserve clause. The ruling was issued in regard to pitchers Andy Messersmith and Dave McNally.

Background
Since the 1880s, baseball owners had included a paragraph described as the reserve clause in every player contract. The paragraph as written allowed teams to renew a contract for a period of one year following the end of a signed contract. Owners asserted and players assumed that contract language effectively meant that a player could be "reserved," by a ballclub's unilateral contract renewal, year after year in perpetuity by the team that had signed the player. That eliminated all market competition and kept salaries relatively low.

Dave McNally and Andy Messersmith both played professional baseball as starting pitchers. McNally first played professionally in 1961, and made his major-league debut in 1962 with the Baltimore Orioles. Messersmith first played professionally in 1966, and made his major-league debut in 1968 with the California Angels.

Grievance

In 1975, Messersmith played his third season with the Los Angeles Dodgers, while McNally played his first season with the Montreal Expos, having been traded by the Orioles in December 1974. Both players had had their 1974 contracts automatically renewed by their teams for the 1975 season, on the basis of the reserve clause. Since neither signed a contract during that option year, both asserted that they were free to sign with other teams the following season (1976). The owners disagreed, arguing that under the reserve clause the one-year contracts were perpetually renewed.

The Major League Baseball Players Association (MLBPA) filed notices of grievance on behalf of both players on October 7, 1975. Hearings were held on November 21, 24 and December 1, 1975, before an arbitration panel composed of MLB Player Relations Committee chief negotiator John Gaherin, MLBPA executive director Marvin Miller, and Seitz—the chairman and impartial arbitrator—agreed upon by both opposing parties.

Decision
Seitz ruled in favor of Messersmith and McNally on December 23, 1975, declaring:

 

Seitz's opinion further stated:

 

In essence, the players were free to bargain with other teams because organized baseball could maintain a player's services for only one year after expiration of the previous contract.  According to Gaherin, Seitz indicated soon after he heard arguments from both sides that he was leaning toward ruling for the players.

Aftermath
MLB appealed the decision to the United States district court for Western Missouri, but Seitz's ruling was upheld on February 3, 1976, by Judge John Watkins Oliver, and later by the Eighth Circuit Court of Appeals. In August, after all appeals were exhausted, the league and players' association reached an agreement allowing players with six years of major-league service to become free agents.

McNally and Messersmith were officially granted free agency on March 16, 1976. Messersmith signed with the Atlanta Braves on April 10, 1976, and went on to play in MLB through the 1979 season, completing his 12-year major-league career with 344 games pitched (295 starts) and a 130–99 win–loss record. McNally did not play professionally after 1975, having finished his 14-year major-league career with 424 games pitched (396 starts) and a 184–119 record.

See also
 Eastham v. Newcastle United, a 1963 court case in England
 Curt Flood, MLB player and plaintiff in Flood v. Kuhn, a 1972 case decided by the U.S. Supreme Court
 Bosman ruling, a 1995 European Court of Justice decision that outlawed a similar reserve system in European football (soccer)

References

External links
 ESPN retrospective

Major League Baseball labor relations
1975 in baseball
Major League Baseball controversies
Baseball law